Centromochlus perugiae is a species of benthopelagic fish, a member of the Auchenipteridae (driftwood catfish) family. They are widely known as honeycomb catfish or oil catfish because of their striking skin pattern. Honeycomb catfish are under  fully grown.

Distribution
Their distribution includes Peru, Ecuador and Columbia. They prefer water temperature in the range  with pH of  6-7.

Behavior
Honeycomb catfish like to anchor themselves into crevices in driftwood and hide. They are mostly nocturnal and seek hiding spaces and shade. A very peaceful species, in an aquarium, honeycomb catfish do not bother other inhabitants of a community tank.

References

Auchenipteridae
Fish described in 1882
Taxa named by Franz Steindachner